Dast Bezanu (also Romanized as Dast Bezānū) is a village in Koregah-e Gharbi Rural District, in the Central District of Khorramabad County, Lorestan Province, Iran. At the 2006 census, its population was 127, in 21 families.

References 

Towns and villages in Khorramabad County